NorCal Lamorinda United SC was an American soccer team based in Orinda, California, United States. Founded in 2009, the team played in the National Premier Soccer League (NPSL), a national amateur league in the fourth tier of the American Soccer Pyramid.

The team played its home games in the stadium on the campus of Miramonte High School. The team's colors are red, white and blue.

Players

Final roster

Stadia
 Stadium at Miramonte High School; Orinda, California (2009)

External links
 Official Site

Defunct soccer clubs in California
Orinda, California
Sports in Contra Costa County, California
Association football clubs established in 2009
2009 establishments in California
2009 disestablishments in California
Association football clubs disestablished in 2009